Vier gegen die Bank ("Four Against the Bank") is a 2016 German crime comedy film directed by Wolfgang Petersen. It was Petersen's first German-language film since Das Boot in 1981 and his final film as a director before his death in 2022. It was his second adaptation of The Nixon Recession Caper by Ralph Maloney. His 1976 adaptation was produced for television broadcast on ARD.

Plot
Four men who are disgruntled about their treatment by the bank join together to steal from it.

Cast
 Til Schweiger as Chris
 Matthias Schweighöfer as Max
 Michael Herbig as Tobias
 Jan Josef Liefers as Peter
 Antje Traue as Elisabeth Zollner 
 Alexandra Maria Lara as Freddie
 Jana Pallaske as Heidi
 Claudia Michelsen as Susanne Schumacher
 Jasmin Lord as sexy girl
 Fahri Yardim as homeless man
 Thomas Heinze as Schumacher
 Chris Theisinger as bank employee
 Stefan Becker as Jesus freak
 Viktor Bleischwitz as bank robber

See also
 Tower Heist (2011)

References

External links
 

2016 films
2010s German-language films
2010s crime comedy films
German crime comedy films
Films directed by Wolfgang Petersen
Films based on American novels
Films based on television plays
Films set in Berlin
Remakes of German films
German heist films
2016 comedy films
Warner Bros. films
2010s German films